Fischbek is a rapid transit railway station (German: Bahnhof or Haltestelle Fischbek) located in the Neugraben-Fischbek quarter of Hamburg. The trains of the Hamburg S-Bahn serve the station on the line S3 from Pinneberg via Hamburg-Altona station and central station to Stade.

Service  
Rail service at Fischbek station:

See also  

 Hamburger Verkehrsverbund (HVV)
 List of Hamburg S-Bahn stations

References

External links 

Hamburg S-Bahn stations in Hamburg
Buildings and structures in Harburg, Hamburg
Railway stations in Germany opened in 2007